2nd Biserovskiy uchastok is a rural locality (a settlement) in Elektrougli Urban Settlement of Noginsky District, Russia. The population was 64 as of 2010.

Geography 
The settlement is located 29 km southwest of Noginsk (the district's administrative centre) by road. Biserovo is the nearest rural locality.

Streets 
 Rabochaya
 Sadovaya
 Tsentralnaya

References 

Rural localities in Moscow Oblast
Populated places in Noginsky District